Viviana Bottaro (born 2 September 1987) is an Italian karateka. She won one of the bronze medals in the women's kata event at the 2020 Summer Olympics in Tokyo, Japan. She has also won numerous medals in the women's individual kata and women's team kata events at the World Karate Championships and the European Karate Championships. She is a three-time bronze medalist in the women's individual kata event at the World Karate Championships. She is also the 2014 European champion in this event.

Biography 
In 2019, she won the silver medal in the women's individual kata event at the European Karate Championships held in Guadalajara, Spain. The following month, she represented Italy at the European Games held in Minsk, Belarus and she won the silver medal in the women's individual kata event.

In 2020, she qualified to represent Italy at the 2020 Summer Olympics in Tokyo, Japan.

In May 2021, she won one of the bronze medals in the women's individual kata event at the European Karate Championships held in Poreč, Croatia. A few months later, she won one of the bronze medals in the women's kata event at the 2020 Summer Olympics. In October 2021, she won the gold medal in her event at the 2021 Mediterranean Karate Championships held in Limassol, Cyprus. In November 2021, she won one of the bronze medals in the women's individual kata event at the World Karate Championships held in Dubai, United Arab Emirates.

Achievements

References

External links 

 
 

1987 births
Living people
Sportspeople from Genoa
Italian female karateka
European Games silver medalists for Italy
Karateka at the 2019 European Games
European Games medalists in karate
Karateka of Fiamme Oro
Karateka at the 2020 Summer Olympics
Medalists at the 2020 Summer Olympics
Olympic medalists in karate
Olympic bronze medalists for Italy
21st-century Italian women